The Highland Wind Energy Center is a 501.4 megawatt (MW) wind farm in O'Brien County, Iowa. It became the largest facility in the state when it was placed online in 2015.

Facility details
The facility is part of $1.9 billion in wind power project announced by MidAmerican Energy in 2013. It was the largest project in the world to be built in a single construction phase. Siemens supplied 218 2.3 MW wind turbines for the facility.

The facility is located at the southern end of Buffalo Ridge.  The Rock Island Clean Line HVDC transmission line was proposed to originate just north of the project.

An expansion of the project, formerly known as Highland II was developed by Invenergy. This expansion was purchased by MidAmerican Energy and constructed in 2016 as the 250 MW O'Brien Wind Farm. It also lies in O'Brien county, just to the north of the Highland project.

Electricity production

See also

Wind power in Iowa
List of wind farms in the United States

References

External links
 MidAmerican Energy - Highland Wind Project

Wind farms in Iowa
Buildings and structures in O'Brien County, Iowa
Energy infrastructure completed in 2015